Derallus is a genus of water scavenger beetles in the family Hydrophilidae. There are about six described species in Derallus.

Species
These six species belong to the genus Derallus:
 Derallus altus (LeConte, 1855)
 Derallus ambitus d'Orchymont, 1940
 Derallus angustus Sharp, 1882
 Derallus intermedius Oliva, 1995
 Derallus rudis Sharp, 1882
 Derallus terraenovae Oliva, 1983

References

Further reading

 

Hydrophilinae
Articles created by Qbugbot